Ivan Vladimir Mažuranić (7 April 1915 – 6 April 1985) was a Yugoslav fencer. He competed in the team foil and individual épée events at the 1936 Summer Olympics.

References

External links
 

1915 births
1985 deaths
Yugoslav male foil fencers
Olympic fencers of Yugoslavia
Fencers at the 1936 Summer Olympics
Yugoslav male épée fencers